Ceratosoma brevicaudatum, the short-tailed ceratosoma, is a species of colourful dorid nudibranch, a sea slug, a shell-less marine gastropod mollusk in the family Chromodorididae.

Distribution 
Houtman Abrolhos, Western Australia, across South Australia and Victoria to Cape Byron, New South Wales, and around Tasmania.

Description
This firm-bodied species grows to a maximum recorded length of 15 centimetres. Within South Australian waters, dark coloured individuals are more common in the west and paler colours more so in the east. An orange form is considered typical in SA.

Ecology
The species feeds on Euryspongia spp. sponges.

References

Chromodorididae
Gastropods described in 1876